Merle Silmato (born in 1968) is an Estonian opera singer (contralto).

In 2001 she graduated from Estonian Music Academy. In 2006 she graduated from Sibelius Academy.

Since 2007 she is working at Finnish National Opera.

Awards:
 2001: 3rd prize in Klaudia Taev Competition

Roles

 Azucena (Verdi "Trubaduur", Vanemuine Theatre)
 Carmen (Bizet "Carmen")
 Tavern's woman (Mussorgsky "Boriss Godunov", Estonia Theatre)

References

Living people
1968 births
21st-century Estonian women opera singers
Tallinn Georg Ots Music School alumni
Estonian Academy of Music and Theatre alumni